The 1999 Greenlandic Men's Football Championship was the 29th edition of the Greenlandic Men's Football Championship. The final round was held in Nuuk. It was won by B-67 Nuuk for the fourth time in its history.

Qualifying stage

North Greenland

Central Greenland

South Greenland

NB The result of one match is unavailable.

Final round

Pool 1

Pool 2

Playoffs

Semi-finals

Seventh-place match

Fifth-place match

Third-place match

Final

See also
Football in Greenland
Football Association of Greenland
Greenland national football team
Greenlandic Men's Football Championship

References

Greenlandic Men's Football Championship seasons
Green
Green
Foot